Li Ming may refer to:

 Lee Meng (1926–2012), Chinese Communist guerrilla leader in Malaya
 Leon Lai (born 1966), Hong Kong singer and actor 
 Li Ming 李銘 (1887-1966; Banker)
 Li Ming (footballer, born 1971), Chinese football player
 Li Ming (footballer, born 1975), Chinese football player and coach
 Li Ming (footballer, born 2000), Chinese football player
 Ming Li, Canadian computer scientist

See also  
Liming (disambiguation)